Gracilisuchidae is an extinct family of suchian archosaurs known from the early Middle Triassic to the early Late Triassic (Anisian – early Carnian) of China and Argentina.

Distribution
Currently, the oldest known gracilisuchid is Turfanosuchus dabanensis from the Anisian stage of Xinjiang, China. Two gracilisuchids are known from the Ladinian or early Carnian stage, Gracilisuchus stipanicicorum and Yonghesuchus sangbiensis, from La Rioja Province of Argentina, and Shanxi, respectively. These species were considered enigmatic prior to the recognition of the family in 2014, suggesting a rapid phylogenetic diversification of archosaurs by the Middle Triassic. This radiation is a part of the broader recovery of 
terrestrial ecosystems after the Permian–Triassic extinction event. Gracilisuchids are known from approximately similar northern and southern mid-palaeolatitudes, demonstrating a wide distribution of early archosaurs over much or all of Pangaea by the early Middle Triassic.

History
The family Gracilisuchidae first appeared in a classification scheme for all fossil 
vertebrates, published by Robert L. Carroll in 1988. As no description or definition were provided by Carroll for the erection of the name, it is unavailable under Article 13.1.1 of the International Code of Zoological Nomenclature. Richard J. Butler, Corwin Sullivan, Martín D. Ezcurra, Jun Liu, Agustina Lecuona and Roland B. Sookias described and officially named the family in 2014, to include several early archosaurs, previously considered enigmatic. Apart from Gracilisuchus stipanicicorum, Carroll assigned to Gracilisuchidae the Middle Triassic Lewisuchus admixtus, which is now considered a silesaurid dinosauriform. Turfanosuchus dabanensis and Yonghesuchus sangbiensis were considered basal or stem archosaurs prior to their inclusion in the family in 2014, depending on phylogenetic hypothesis.

References 

Crurotarsans
Triassic archosaurs
Middle Triassic first appearances
Late Triassic extinctions
Triassic reptiles of Asia
Triassic reptiles of South America
 
Prehistoric reptile families